Gloria Mundi may refer to:

Gloria Mundi (film)

See also
Sic transit gloria mundi, Latin phrase